Victor Waddington (1907 - 1981) was a British art dealer, active in Dublin and then London, an early advocate for the work of Jack Yeats and Henri Hayden. He was the father of fellow art dealers, Leslie and Theo Waddington.

Career
He started the Victor Waddington Galleries at 8 South Anne Street, Dublin in 1927, having moved there from London. The gallery exhibited modernist and avant-garde work from Irish, British, and European artists. Other artists that were featured included Yvonne Jammet, Seán Keating, and Moyra Barry. Waddington is regarded as one of the main art dealers of the early years of the Irish Free State. In 1943 he became sole dealer and business manager for Jack Yeats and was crucial for his career and reputation.

He founded Waddington Galleries and the Victor Waddington Gallery on London's Cork Street. In 1966, his son Leslie Waddington established a new gallery at the former property with the backing of Alex Bernstein, a member of the Granada media dynasty, having previously worked with Victor.

Personal life
He is the father of Leslie and Theo Waddington, both also art dealers.

References

1907 births
1981 deaths
Art dealers from London
Victor
20th-century English businesspeople